London Bulletin was a monthly avant-garde art magazine which was affiliated with the London Gallery between April 1938 and June 1940. It was one of the most significant surrealist publication.

History and profile
The plans to launch the magazine began following the international surrealist exhibition in London in 1936. The magazine was first published in April 1938 with the title London Gallery Bulletin. It was renamed as London Bulletin from the second issue. It came out monthly, and its publisher was the Arno Press based in London. Later the Bradley Press became its publisher. The magazine was financed by Roland Penrose.

London Bulletin regularly published the pamphlets of the exhibitions presented at the London Gallery. It frequently featured reproductions of surrealist paintings and poems of the surrealists. The manifesto of an Egyptian anarchist post-surrealist group, Art et Liberté (Art and Freedom), was published in the magazine in English in 1938. The group members were Anwar Kamel, Ramses Younan and Kamel el-Telmissany who would launch a magazine, Al Tatawwur, in Cairo in 1940. In the document entitled Long Live Degenerate Art! they objected the Nazis' views on the ‘degenerate art’ and the Marxists' notion 'that modern society looks with aversion on any innovative creation in art and literature which threatens the cultural system on which that society is based, whether it be from the point of view of thought or of meaning.' London Bulletin folded before World War II, and its last issue, numbered 18–20, appeared in June 1940. The same year the London Gallery was also closed.

London Gallery News, a small newspaper, was the successor of London Bulletin.

Editors and contributors
E. L. T. Mesens was the editor-in-chief. Humphrey Jennings contributed to the first two issues of the magazine and then began to work as an assistant editor to E. L. T. Mesens. Jennings and Gordon Onslow Ford were assistant editors from issue 3. Roland Penrose served as the assistant editor from issue 8/9 published in January 1939 and was replaced assistant editor by George Reavey from issue 11 dated in March 1939.

Major contributors included Paul Éluard, Herbert Read, André Breton, Samuel Beckett, Francis Picabia, Eileen Agar, John Banting and Conroy Maddox. Belgian surrealist writer Marcel Mariën also published articles in the magazine.

See also
 List of avant-garde magazines

References

1938 establishments in the United Kingdom
1940 disestablishments in the United Kingdom
Avant-garde magazines
Defunct magazines published in the United Kingdom
Magazines established in 1938
Magazines disestablished in 1940
Magazines published in London
Visual arts magazines published in the United Kingdom
Monthly magazines published in the United Kingdom
Surrealist magazines